Celestus molesworthi, the Jamaican galliwasp or Garman's galliwasp, is a species of lizard of the Diploglossidae family. It is found in Jamaica.

References

Celestus
Reptiles described in 1940
Reptiles of Jamaica
Endemic fauna of Jamaica
Taxa named by Chapman Grant